Kalpi is a constituency of the Uttar Pradesh Legislative Assembly covering the town of Kalpi in the Jalaun district of Uttar Pradesh, India.

Kalpi is one of five assembly constituencies in the Jalaun Lok Sabha constituency. Since 2008, this assembly constituency is numbered 220 amongst 403 constituencies.

Currently this seat belongs to Samajwadi Party candidate Vinod Chaturvedi who won in last Assembly election of 2022 Uttar Pradesh Legislative Assembly election defeating Bahujan Samaj Party candidate Chhote Singh by a margin of 2,816 votes.

Members of the Legislative Assembly

Election results

2022

References

External links
 

Assembly constituencies of Uttar Pradesh
Jalaun district